"Cloak and dagger" was a fighting style common in the Renaissance involving a knife hidden beneath a cloak. The term later came into use as a metaphor, referring to situations involving intrigue, secrecy, espionage, or mystery.

Overview
In "The Knight's Tale", published around 1400, English poet Geoffrey Chaucer referred to "The smiler with the knife under the cloak".

Taken literally, the phrase could refer to using the cloak and dagger in historical European martial arts.  The purpose of the cloak was to obscure the presence or movement of the dagger, to provide minor protection from slashes, to restrict the movement of the opponent's weapon, and to provide a distraction. Fencing master Achille Marozzo taught and wrote about this method of combat in his book, Opera Nova.  Fighting this way was not necessarily seen as a first choice of weapons, but may have become a necessity in situations of self-defense if one were not carrying a sword, with the cloak being a common garment of the times that could be pressed into use as a defensive aid. Both Marozzo and other masters such as Di Grassi also taught the use of the cloak with the rapier.

The metaphorical meaning of the phrase dates from the early 19th century. It is a translation from the French de cape et d'épée and Spanish de capa y espada ("of cloak and sword"). These phrases referred to a genre of swashbuckler drama in which the main characters wore these items. In 1840, Henry Wadsworth Longfellow wrote, "In the afternoon read La Dama Duende of Calderón – a very good comedy of 'cloak and sword'." Charles Dickens subsequently used the phrase "cloak and dagger" in his work Barnaby Rudge a year later as a sarcastic reference to this style of drama. The imagery of these two items became associated with the archetypal spy or assassin: the cloak, worn to hide one's identity or remain hidden from view, and the dagger, a concealable and silent weapon.

In contemporary culture
The sword fight in Peter Martins' ballet of Romeo + Juliet culminates in Romeo stabbing Tybalt repeatedly in the back with a dagger, having flung his cloak over the latter's head. 

Cloak and Dagger are also the names of two Marvel Comics characters debuting in 1982.

The Spy In Team Fortress 2 owns a wristwatch called "The Cloak and Dagger", alluding to his affinity towards knives and backstabbing.

SEAL Team ONE's unit logo features a seal wrapped in a cloak, holding a dagger, referencing the nature of their clandestine missions.

References

English-language idioms
Historical European martial arts